Pablo Marí Villar (born 31 August 1993) is a Spanish professional footballer who plays as a centre-back for  club Monza, on loan from  club Arsenal.

Marí graduated from Mallorca's youth academy and played for various clubs throughout his career, in Spain, the Netherlands, Brazil, England and Italy. He won the Copa Libertadores and Série A in 2019 with Flamengo, and was included in the Série A Team of the Year that year.

Career

Mallorca
Born in Almussafes, Valencian Community, Marí was a product of RCD Mallorca's youth system. He made his debut as a senior with the reserves at the age of just 17, going on to spend several seasons in the third division.

Marí made his first appearance with the first team on 7 December 2011, playing 30 minutes in a 2–2 draw against Granada CF after coming off the bench for fellow youth graduate Pedro Bigas. On 5 May 2012 he played his second La Liga game, again acting as a substitute in a 1–0 home win over Levante UD.

Marí continued to be almost exclusively associated with the B-side until the end of his spell in the Balearic Islands.

Gimnàstic
On 2 September 2013, Marí signed a contract with Gimnàstic de Tarragona also in the third level. He made his debut for the Catalans on 12 October, starting and conceding a penalty in a 2–2 draw at CD Olímpic de Xàtiva.

Marí scored his first goal for Nàstic on 1 December 2013, the winner in a 2–1 home victory against Levante UD B. On 25 June 2015, after achieving promotion to Segunda División, he signed a new three-year deal with the club.

Marí scored his first professional goal on 30 August 2015, netting his team's first in a 2–1 away defeat of CD Tenerife.

Manchester City
On 15 August 2016, Marí was transferred to Premier League side Manchester City. A day later, he was loaned to Girona FC in a season-long deal.

In the following two campaigns, still owned by City, Marí played with NAC Breda (Dutch Eredivisie, where he was team captain) and Deportivo de La Coruña (Spanish second tier).

Flamengo
On 11 July 2019, Marí signed with Flamengo on a contract through 2022, for an approximate fee of €1.3 million (or R$5.5 million). He became the third Spanish player for the Brazilian club, after goalkeeper Talladas in the late 1930s and forward José Ufarte in the 1960s. He made his debut as a starter on 28 July in a Série A match against Botafogo de Futebol e Regatas at the Maracanã Stadium, a 3–2 win; he quickly established himself in the first team, with manager Jorge Jesus pairing him with Rodrigo Caio. 

Marí scored his first goal for Mengão on 25 August 2019, with a volley inside the box in a 3–0 away victory over Ceará Sporting Club. His second in the league came on 7 September, this time with a header against Avaí FC in a 3–0 win at Estádio Nacional Mané Garrincha. In November, he became the first Spaniard to win the Copa Libertadores, the major South American club competition. Marí made headlines for wearing the number 24 in the Copa Libertadores, as the number is subject to a homophobic taboo in Brazil.

Arsenal
On 29 January 2020, Marí joined English Premier League club Arsenal on loan until the end of the season, with an option for Arsenal to make the deal permanent in the summer. Arsenal's technical director Edu said: "Pablo is an experienced player who will provide us with additional defensive quality. We have been monitoring Pablo’s career for a while and we are very pleased to have reached agreement with Flamengo for him to join us initially until the end of our season." Marí made two appearances for Arsenal, a 2–0 FA Cup win at Portsmouth and a 1–0 Premier League win at home to West Ham, before the season was suspended due to COVID-19 pandemic.

On 17 June 2020, Marí was injured playing in a 3–0 defeat at Manchester City, in the first game of the league restart. Arsenal confirmed post-match he would miss the remainder of the season with a "significant" ankle injury. Despite this injury, Arsenal announced on 24 June that Marí would join the club permanently for an undisclosed fee on 1 July, upon the opening of the summer transfer window.

On 3 December 2020, Marí scored his first goal for Arsenal in a 4–1 home win over Rapid Wien in the UEFA Europa League.

Loans to Udinese and Monza
On 20 January 2022, Marí joined Serie A club Udinese on loan until the end of the 2021–22 season.

On 11 August, he was loaned to newly-promoted Serie A side Monza. Marì made his debut for Monza on 14 August, as a starter in a 2–1 Serie A defeat to Torino.

Personal life
Marí and his wife Veronica Chacon have a son, Pablo Jr. (b. 2018).

On 27 October 2022, Marí was stabbed and injured at a Carrefour supermarket in Assago, Metropolitan City of Milan. He was taken to hospital conscious and not in a serious condition. Monza's CEO Adriano Galliani stated: "His life is not in danger, he should recover quickly". A man was killed during the attack and four others were injured. The perpetrator was a man with mental health problems.

Career statistics

Honours
Flamengo
 Campeonato Brasileiro Série A: 2019
 Copa Libertadores: 2019

Individual
 Copa Libertadores Team of the Tournament: 2019
 Campeonato Brasileiro Série A Team of the Year: 2019

References

External links

 Profile at the Arsenal F.C. website
 Profile at the A.C. Monza website 
 

1993 births
Living people
People from Ribera Baixa
Sportspeople from the Province of Valencia
Footballers from the Valencian Community
Spanish footballers
Association football central defenders
RCD Mallorca B players
RCD Mallorca players
Gimnàstic de Tarragona footballers
Manchester City F.C. players
Girona FC players
NAC Breda players
Deportivo de La Coruña players
CR Flamengo footballers
Arsenal F.C. players
Udinese Calcio players
A.C. Monza players
Segunda División B players
La Liga players
Segunda División players
Eredivisie players
Campeonato Brasileiro Série A players
Copa Libertadores-winning players
Premier League players
Serie A players
Spanish expatriate footballers
Spanish expatriate sportspeople in England
Spanish expatriate sportspeople in the Netherlands
Spanish expatriate sportspeople in Brazil
Spanish expatriate sportspeople in Italy
Expatriate footballers in England
Expatriate footballers in the Netherlands
Expatriate footballers in Brazil
Expatriate footballers in Italy
Stabbing survivors